Stockdale is an unincorporated community in Clay County, Missouri, United States. It was so named because livestock was shipped by rail from its  depot.

See also

References

Unincorporated communities in Clay County, Missouri
Unincorporated communities in Missouri